East St. Louis Lincoln High School was a high school in East St. Louis, Illinois. It was established in 1909 as a school for blacks and consolidated with East St. Louis Senior High School in 1998.

History
The first school in East St. Louis named for Abraham Lincoln was a 1st–12th-grade school for black children that opened in 1886 at Sixth Street and St. Louis Avenue. In 1909, during a period of rapid expansion in East St. Louis, this school was closed, with its building becoming the headquarters of the city board of education, and East St. Louis Lincoln High School opened as a high school for blacks at 1100 East Broadway. It was originally a junior-senior high school, but later became a senior high school. By the late 1940s, with black migration continuing and the school system in the city still effectively segregated, the school was so overcrowded that the auditorium, the library, the study hall, and the music room had all been converted into classrooms; the school board promised to build a second black high school but allocated insufficient money, prompting a sit-in in 1949 for equal facilities. In 1950 the school moved to a new building at 1211 Bond Avenue; in the early 1960s students began to be permitted to transfer to the predominantly white East St. Louis Senior High School if Lincoln did not offer the electives they wanted.

In 1998 it was consolidated with East St. Louis Senior High School; the building was used as a grade school for a few years after that, but was then abandoned.

Athletics
The Lincoln Tigers and Tigerettes won 29 state championships in sports, 14 of them in girls' track and field within a 17-year period; the girls' track and field coach, Nino Fennoy, became the coach at East St. Louis Senior High School after consolidation, as did the boys' basketball coach, Bennie Lewis Sr., whose program dominated the state in the 1980s. The two schools had been traditional rivals, particularly in basketball.

Notable alumni and staff
Elwood Buchanan, music teacher
Miles Davis, jazz musician
LaPhonso Ellis, basketball player
Terreon Gully, jazz drummer
Al Joyner, track and field athlete, gold medalist at 1984 Summer Olympics
Jackie Joyner-Kersee, track and field athlete, winner of six Olympic medals and four world championships
Cuonzo Martin, basketball player, head coach at University of Missouri
Ted Savage, former Major League Baseball player

References

1909 establishments in Illinois
Educational institutions established in 1909
Educational institutions disestablished in 1998
1998 disestablishments in Illinois
Former high schools in Illinois
Schools in St. Clair County, Illinois